Barrie—Springwater—Oro-Medonte is a provincial electoral district in Ontario, Canada. It elects one member to the Legislative Assembly of Ontario. The riding was created in 2015, and was first contested in the 2018 General Election.

Members of Provincial Parliament

Election results

References

External links
2018 Riding map from Elections Ontario

Ontario provincial electoral districts
Politics of Barrie